Dildarian is a studio album by Punjabi singer and actor, Amrinder Gill. This was Amrinder's second ever major success after his previous album Ik Vaada. The album was composed by the "music man", Sukshinder Shinda and had lyrics by Raj Kakra, Dev Raj Jassal, Amarjit Sandhar, Jassi Jallandri, Amerdeep Gill and Satti Khokhewalia.

Track listing
All music composed by Sukshinder Shinda.

Awards
The album was nominated for a three awards at the 2006 Punjabi Music Awards:
Best Music Video for Dildarian
Best Pop Album for Dildarian
Best Pop Vocalist (Male) for Sohni Kudi (Mail Karade)

References 

2005 albums
Amrinder Gill albums